The biennial election for the Mayor of Raleigh, North Carolina was held on Tuesday, Oct. 6, 2015. The election was nonpartisan. Incumbent Mayor Nancy McFarlane won a third term in office.

Candidates
Nancy McFarlane, Mayor since 2011, former City Council member
Dr. Robert "Bob" Weltzin, chiropractor and candidate for Mayor in 2013

Results

Notes

External links
Wake County Board of Elections

2015
Raleigh
Raleigh mayoral